Biloela Airport  is an airport in Biloela, Queensland, Australia.

See also
 List of airports in Queensland

Airports in Queensland